Nina Rochelle is a Swedish rock band established in 2002 by  Martin Svensson, Johan Lundgren and Per Wasberg. Occasionally Markus Mustonen of Swedish band Kent played in live concerts with the band. Pontus Frisk joined in 2005 and Fredrik Lundberg in 2007. The band has released three albums: Om Sverige vill ha det så (16 October 2003), Mörkertal (2005) and Måndagsfolket (26 April 2006). They have not released new materials since 2009, and there are speculations that it will be disbanding.

Members
Johan Lundgren – backing vocals, guitar (2003–)
Per Wasberg – singer, bass (2003–)
Martin Svensson – singer, guitar (2003–)
Pontus Frisk – drums (2005–)
Fredrik Lundberg – keyboard, singer (2007–)

Discography

Albums
2003: Om Sverige vill ha det så
2005: Mörkertal
2006: Måndagsfolket

Singles
2003: "Taxi 43" 
2003: "(Happy) Jag hatar att det är så" 
2004: "Stockholm kommer förstöra mig" 
2005: "Mörkertal" 
2005: "Rött ljus" 
2006: "Måndagsfolket"

References

External links
Official website
MySpace

Musical groups established in 2002
Swedish alternative rock groups
2002 establishments in Sweden